Roland Mertelsmann (born 5 October 1944 in Hameln) is a German hematologist and oncologist. He was a professor at the Freiburg University Medical Center, Department of Internal Medicine I (Oncology/Hematology). Mertelsmann is known for his scientific works in the fields of hematology, oncology, gene therapy and stem cell transplantation.

Biography 
Mertelsmann studied medicine at the University of Göttingen 1966–68. He was a doctoral candidate at the Max Planck Institute for Experimental Medicine at Heinrich Matthaei in Göttingen 1966–68. He continued his medical education at the School of Medicine King's College London and at the Columbia-Presbyterian Medical Center, New York 1968–78. After graduating from Hamburg University Medical School and receiving his MD degree, he became Research Fellow at the Department of Developmental Hematopoiesis and received a special fellowship in Hematology and Clinical Oncology at Memorial Sloan-Kettering Cancer Center (MSKCC), 1976–78. There he contributed to the isolation of the blood stimulating growth factor G-CSF, which leads to a faster recovery of white blood cells after chemotherapy and radiation therapy protecting patients better against severe infections. From 1978 to 86 he was clinical assistant physician at MSKCC, then assistant attending physician and associate attending physician at the Memorial Hospital of Sloan-Kettering Cancer Center. He was promoted from assistant professor of medicine to associate professor of medicine at Cornell University, New York. In 1985, he returned to Germany and was appointed professor and head of the 3rd Medical Clinic Hematology and Oncology at the University of Mainz, Germany, University Medical Center. 1989 he accepted a professorship at the University of Freiburg. At Freiburg University Medical Center he became the director of the Department for Medicine I, Oncology, Hematology and Stem Cell Transplantation. He retired in 2012.

During his career Mertelsmann recruited and promoted young scientists. Several leading positions at universities and in the industry were occupied with former team members of Mertelsmann. In 2008 he founded the International Master Program in Biomedical Sciences, a cooperation of the universities of Freiburg and Buenos Aires, educating and training international master students in biomedicine. In 2014 he initiated the foundation of the journal JOSHA, a novel internet platform to access the broad diversity of important discoveries and creativity in the fields of science, humanities and arts. Mertelsmann published more than 400 articles in medical journals.

Scientific contribution
Mertelsmann's experimental, translational and clinical work has focused on understanding the pathogenesis and pathobiology of malignant diseases and, based on these insights, to develop novel strategies to treat cancer and leukemia.

Molecular and cellular mechanisms of malignancy- First description of a human RNA polymerase
After discovery of the genetic code by Heinrich Matthaei and Marshall Nirenberg (1962), Mertelsmann began his research for his medical doctorate as a medical student in Heinrich Matthaei's Laboratory at the Max-Planck-Institute for experimental Medicine in Göttingen, Germany, demonstrating and characterizing for the first time a human RNA-Polymerase. Since nucleic acid synthesis is an important target for chemotherapeutic agents, he subsequently investigated in his team together with various colleagues, DNA-Polymerases, especially terminal deoxynucleotidyl transferase (TdT), and RNA-Polymerases as diagnostic and prognostic markers in leukemias and lymphomas.

Studies of the Pathophysiology and Molecular Biology of Cancer Cells
The “Plasticity” of hematopoietic stem cells (HSC), i.e. the differentiation of HSC into cells of other organs, was intensively studied with Alexandros Spyridonidis in patients after allogeneic bone marrow transplantation. These studies demonstrated conclusively, that this phenomenon can be observed in these patients, but is a rare event. Molecular mechanisms of B-cell neoplasias were investigated together with Binder, Trepel and Dierks, the pathogenic significance of granulocytes in Graft-versus-host disease with Zeiser and his colleagues.

Clinical Significance of the Leukemia Phenotype
As a member of the clinical (Director Bayard Clarkson) and laboratory teams (Director Malcolm A.S. Moore), he carried out a systematic analysis of all patients with acute myeloid leukemia (AML) treated at MSKCC, defining the prognostic and predictive parameters of cell cytology, cell growth in vitro and enzymatic markers. By using all techniques available at the time for phenotypic characterization of leukemia cells, he was successful in discovering and describing novel subentities of acute leukemias.

New therapeutic Modalities
In Cooperation with Karl Welte and his colleagues at MSKCC the purification and molecular and biological characterization of cytokines, important regulators of cell division, differentiation and migration, were the focus of his work in the following years at MSKCC. Interleukin-2 as well as G-CSF were purified to homogeneity, First translational and clinical studies of cytokines followed. Since experiments in murine models demonstrated that local production by gene transduced cells produced a stronger and more specific immune response than a systemic application, e.g. of Interleukin-2, this strategy was also pursued by his group in Phase I clinical trials.  These studies contributed to the later, successful clinical implementation of gene therapy for this and other indications.

Clinical Studies
In clinical trials for patients with leukemias and lymphomas at the MSKCC and subsequently in German and European clinical trial groups, new therapeutic concepts were studied including classical chemotherapies as well as novel therapeutic strategies. For some rare, generally lethal cancers, the innovative use of rapidly recycling classical chemotherapy combinations followed by immediate High Dose Chemotherapy with HSC transplantation, led to long term remission and probably cures, which had not been seen with other therapies and in historical controls.

As clinical oncologist Mertelsmann also search for novel strategies to not only prolong life, but to increase quality of life. The systematic development of aerobic training programs for cancer patients undergoing chemotherapy and bone morrow transplantation was highly successful and is now being used in many cancer centers worldwide.

Accusation of scientific misconduct 
Mertelsmann was involved in a scientific misconduct affair in 1997. The complaint focussed on the falsification of laboratory data. An investigation commission did not prove the active participation of Mertelsmann.

Academic memberships 
Mertelsmann is or was member of many international scientific organizations or journals, among them many years at the journals European Journal of Cancer and Annals of Hematology. He is a foundation member of the Comprehensive Cancer Center Freiburg (CCCF), Initiator and director of the International Biomedical Exchange Program (IMEP), founder of the ARGER-Foundation, editor of the SRC-SDARF-UJDRF Joint Programme in Stem Cell Research, Stockholm and president of the International Association for Comparative Research on Leukemia and related Diseases (IACRLD).

Other select memberships:

 1979 American Society for Clinical Oncology
 1979 American Society for Hematology
 1979 American Association for Cancer Research
 1979 New York Academy of Sciences
 1990 European Society of Medical Oncology
 1993 Royal Society of Medicine
 1997 International Society for Hematotherapy and Graft Engineering
 1998 American Society for Gene Therapy

Awards 

 1976 Konjetzny Prize for Cancer Research
 1980 Vincenz Czerny Award for Cancer Research (DGHO)
 1982 Boyer Award for Clinical Investigation (MSKCC)
 1985 Warner Award for Cancer Research (Warner Foundation)
 1990 Hamilton-Farley Award (ESMO)
 2000 Excellency Award, 13th International Symposium, Molecular Biology of Hematopoiesis, New York City
 2005 Professor honoris causa, Universidad del Salvador, Buenos Aires, Argentinien
 2007 Doctor honoris causa, University "Gr. T. Popa", Iasi, Rumänien
 2008 Professor honoris causa, Universidad de Buenos Aires (UBA), Buenos Aires, Argentinien
 2011 Doctor honoris causa, Universidad de Buenos Aires (UBA), Buenos Aires, Argentina

Publications 

Articles in journals
 Publication list ResearchGate
 PubMed Publication list

Books (selectionl)

 Das Blaue Buch: Chemotherapie-Manual Hämatologie und Internistische Onkologie. 5. Auflage. Springer Medizin, Berlin 2014, .
 Das Rote Buch: Hämatologie und Internistische Onkologie. 5., überarb. und erw. Auflage. ecomed Medizin, Heidelberg 2014, .
 mit Monika Engelhardt: Perspektiven einer zukünftigen Medizin und eines sich wandelnden Arztbildes. Rombach 2008, .
 Leukämien und maligne Lymphome. Thieme, Stuttgart 1981.
 mit Monika Engelhardt, Dietmar P. Berger und Philippe Moreau (eds.): Précis d'hématologie et d'oncologie. Springer, Paris 2011, .

External links 
 Roland Mertelsmann – Drang zur Weltspitze (Wissenschaft.de Archiv)
 Aufklärung ohne Konsequenz (ZEIT Online 2001)
 Persönliche Erklärung von Prof. Mertelsmann über wiss. Fälschungen

See also 
Roland Mertelsmann in:
 Interleukin 2
 Rituximab
 Granulocyte colony-stimulating factor
 Chang Yi Wang

References 

German oncologists
German hematologists
20th-century German physicians
21st-century German physicians
1944 births
Living people